Dr. Abdiweli Sheikh Abdillahi Soufi is a Somaliland politician, who is currently serving as the Minister of Information & Communication Technology of Somaliland.

See also

 Ministry of Telecommunications and Technology (Somaliland)
 Politics of Somaliland
 List of Somaliland politicians

References

Peace, Unity, and Development Party politicians
Living people
Government ministers of Somaliland
Year of birth missing (living people)